Georges Leon Rey (born 1945) is an American philosopher. He is a professor of philosophy at the University of Maryland.

Biography
Rey received a doctoral degree in philosophy from Harvard University in 1978.  His thesis was titled The possibility of psychology: some preliminary issues, and was completed under Hilary Putnam.

His book Contemporary Philosophy of Mind discusses the topic of philosophy of mind. One major focus of Rey's exposition relates to eliminativism and instrumentalism, particularly with respect to the mental states that we are subjectively aware of by way of introspection. Rey is the author of the current article on philosophy of mind at Encyclopædia Britannica Online.

Books

References

External links
  faculty profile page at the University of Maryland
 The Language of Thought Hypothesis entry at the Stanford Encyclopedia of Philosophy includes mention of how Rey's Computational/Representational Theory of Thought relates to language of thought.

University of Maryland, College Park faculty
Living people
1945 births
Harvard University alumni